The 15th Annual Tejano Music Awards were held on February 11, 1995, at the Alamodome in San Antonio, Texas. The Tejano Music Awards is an annual awards ceremony recognizing the accomplishments of Tejano musicians from the previous year.

Award winners

Vocalists of The Year
Male Vocalist of The Year
Emilio 
Female Vocalist of The Year
Selena

Vocal Duo Of the Year
Roberto Pulido and Emilio Navaira

Albums of the Year
Orchestra: Amor Prohibido by Selena
Progressive: Ya Me Canse by David Lee Garza y Los Musicales
Traditional: Tres Ramitas by Hometown Boys

Songs of The Year
Song of The Year
"Bidi Bidi Bom Bom" by Selena
Single of The Year
"Amor Prohibido" by Selena
Tejano Country Song of The Year
"She Can't Say I Didn't Cry" by Rick Trevino
Instrumental of the Year
"El Tren" by Los Chamacos
Tejano Music Video of the Year
"Lucero De Mi Alma" by Emilio Navaira
Best Crossover Song
”Techno Cumbia” by Selena

Entertainers of the Year
Male Entertainer of The Year
Emilio Navaira
Female Entertainer of The Year
Selena

Most Promising Band of The Year
La Diferenzia

Showband of The Year
Culturas

See also
Tejano Music Awards

References

External links
The Tejano Music Awards official website

Tejano Music Awards by year
Tejano Music Awards
Tejano Music Awards
Tejano Music Awards
Tejano Music Awards